Prince Kwidama (born 23 March 1985) is a Dutch Antillean sprinter.

In the 100 metres he reached the quarter-final at the 2007 Summer Universiade, semi-final at the 2008 Central American and Caribbean Championships. In the 200 metres he was knocked out in the heats at the 2003 Central American and Caribbean Championships.

In the 4 x 100 metres relay he won a gold medal at the 2006 Central American and Caribbean Games, finished sixth at the 2007 Pan American Games, was disqualified at the 2007 NACAC Championships and won a bronze medal at the 2010 Central American and Caribbean Games.

His personal best times were the modest 10.43 seconds in the 100 metres, achieved in May 2007 in Caracas; and 21.65 seconds in the 200 metres, achieved in April 2007 in El Paso, Texas.

References 

1985 births
Living people
Dutch Antillean male sprinters
Place of birth missing (living people)
Pan American Games competitors for the Netherlands Antilles
Athletes (track and field) at the 2007 Pan American Games
Central American and Caribbean Games gold medalists for the Netherlands Antilles
Central American and Caribbean Games bronze medalists for the Netherlands Antilles
Competitors at the 2006 Central American and Caribbean Games
Central American and Caribbean Games medalists in athletics